There is a Brazilian diaspora in Mexico. Although the first Portuguese-speaking immigrants in Mexico were the Portuguese, Brazilians today are the largest Portuguese-speaking community living in the country, numbering around 45,000 individuals.

History
There has been a Brazilian presence in Mexico since at least 1895, when the National Census counted 91 residents. As a result of the 1964 Brazilian coup d'état, around one hundred individuals were admitted into Mexico as political refugees.

Institutions
Founded in 1945 in Mexico City, the main cultural organization is the Centro Cultural Brasil-México. With more than fourteen thousand works, the center houses the largest collection of Brazilian books in Mexico. The collection grew through the donations from the Brazilian community, the Brazilian Embassy and publishers that have participated in the Guadalajara International Book Fair.

Notable individuals

 Football 
 Luís Roberto Alves, striker
 Leandro Augusto, midfielder
 Evanivaldo Castro, forward
 Alex Fernandes, striker
 Ricardo Ferretti, midfielder, manager 
 Eder Pacheco, striker
 Julio César Pinheiro, midfielder
 Flavio Rogério, defender
 Geraldo Francisco dos Santos, midfielder 
 Giovani dos Santos, striker
 Jonathan dos Santos, midfielder
 José Aílton da Silva, attacking midfielder
 Lucas Silva, attacking midfielder 
 Sinha, attacking midfielder, central midfielder
 Wilson Tiago, defensive midfielder
 Anselmo Vendrechovski Júnior, center back
 Edson Zwaricz, striker

 Other 
 Félix Bernardelli, painter
 Jaime Camil, actor
 Khotan Fernández, actor
 Giselle Itié, actress
 Metturo , singer, actor and influencer
 Santiago Lambre, show jumper
 Orlandina de Oliveira, sociologist
 Léia Scheinvar, botanist

See also
Brazil–Mexico relations
Portuguese Mexicans

References

External links
 Portal Brasil: Comunidade Brasileira no México

Brazilian diaspora by country
 
Ethnic groups in Mexico
Immigration to Mexico